Newton-with-Clifton is a civil parish in the Borough of Fylde, Lancashire, England.  It contains 15 buildings that are recorded in the National Heritage List for England as designated listed buildings, all of which are listed at Grade II.  This grade is the lowest of the three gradings given to listed buildings and is applied to "buildings of national importance and special interest".  The parish contains the villages of Clifton, Dowbridge, Newton-with-Scales and Salwick, but is otherwise mainly rural.  The Lancaster Canal passes through the parish, and there are nine listed buildings associated with it, eight bridges and a milestone.  The other listed buildings are two cruck-framed cottages, a country house, two farmhouses, and a restored windmill.

Buildings

References

Citations

Sources

Lists of listed buildings in Lancashire
Buildings and structures in the Borough of Fylde